Kenneth Ira Berns is an American virologist who is currently a distinguished professor emeritus at the department of Molecular Genetics and Microbiology at the University of Florida College of Medicine. He is primarily known for his work on adeno-associated viruses (AAV), and his group was one of the first which showed the specificity of the integration of the AAV genomes into the cellular genome. He has been a member of the National Academy of Sciences since 1995.

He was the president of the American Society for Virology (ASV) for the academic year 1988–1989 and the president of the American Society for Microbiology (ASM) for the academic year 1996–1997. He was elected in 2000 a fellow of the American Association for the Advancement of Science.

References

Living people
Year of birth missing (living people)
Place of birth missing (living people)
American virologists
Members of the United States National Academy of Sciences
University of Florida faculty
Fellows of the American Academy of Microbiology
Fellows of the American Association for the Advancement of Science